Zeynalabedin Qiyami (born 1891 in Ahar — died in Baku) was an Iranian Azerbaijani politician and Jurist, by Ja'far Pishevari with the formation Azerbaijan People's Government in 1945, was Chairman of Supreme Court of Azerbaijan's Government in the Ja'far Pishevari Cabinet.

Notes

References
 *

People from Ahar
1891 births
Azerbaijani Democratic Party politicians
Year of death missing
Iranian emigrants to the Soviet Union
Burials at Alley of Honor